Dónall Farmer (born Daniel Patrick Farmer; 24 November 1937 – 6 December 2018) was an Irish  television film director, producer, RTÉ Head of Drama (succeeding Chloe Gibson) and actor who performed on stage and in film and television productions. Known for his part in Glenroe, the Irish television series in which he played Father Tim Devereux, he won two Jacob's Awards for his work on RTÉ Television, in 1969 and 1979 respectively. A notable contributor to stage productions in the Abbey Theatre, his play parts span 1980–1989. He was also involved in the Irish-language Damer Theatre.

Filmography

See also
 Deeply Regretted By...

References

External links

1937 births
2018 deaths
Irish male stage actors
Irish male television actors
Jacob's Award winners
RTÉ people
20th-century Irish male actors
People educated at North Monastery